Area function may refer to:

Inverse hyperbolic function
Antiderivative